The district of Beauce was established in 1853, under the Union regime of 1841.

Beauce was represented by one Member at the Legislative Assembly of the Province of Canada.

Earlier, there had also been an electoral district named Beauce in Lower Canada, but it was abolished when Lower Canada ceased to exist after the Act of Union 1840.

See also
History of Canada
History of Quebec
Beauce Federal Electoral District
Beauce Provincial Electoral District
Beauce (electoral district in Lower Canada)
Politics of Canada
Politics of Quebec

Electoral districts of Canada East